Mattoon Township is one of twelve townships in Coles County, Illinois, USA.  As of the 2010 census, its population was 15,817 and it contained 7,536 housing units.

Geography

Cities, towns, villages
 Mattoon (west half)

Extinct towns
 Lane Acres
 Lipsey
 Magnet
 Wabash Point

Cemeteries
The township contains two cemeteries: Calvary and Dodge Grove.

Major highways
  Interstate 57
  US Route 45
  Illinois Route 16
  Illinois Route 121

Demographics

School districts
 Mattoon Community Unit School District 2

Political districts
 Illinois' 15th congressional district
 State House District 110
 State Senate District 55

References
 
 United States Census Bureau 2007 TIGER/Line Shapefiles
 United States National Atlas

External links
 City-Data.com
 Illinois State Archives

Adjacent townships 

Townships in Coles County, Illinois
Townships in Illinois